Tim Vleminckx (born 31 March 1987, in Antwerp) is a Belgian football player who plays as a right back for KSV Bornem.

For the 2007/08 season he was on loan to Lierse SK from K.F.C. Germinal Beerschot. Vleminckx previously played for Germinal in the Belgian First Division.

References

1987 births
Living people
Beerschot A.C. players
Belgian footballers
Lierse S.K. players
Footballers from Antwerp

Association football defenders